Robert Williams (born 1951) is a Welsh Anglican priest. He was the Archdeacon of Gower from 2000 to 2016.

Williams was educated at the University of Wales Bangor and St. Michael's College, Llandaff and ordained in 1976. He held incumbencies at Reynoldston and  Denbigh before his appointment as Archdeacon.

References

1951 births
Alumni of St Michael's College, Llandaff
Alumni of Bangor University
Archdeacons of Gower
Living people